Olesko is a settlement in Ukraine. Oleško is a municipality and village in the Czech Republic. Olesko or Oleško may also refer to:
Březová-Oleško, a municipality in the Czech Republic
Kathryn Olesko, American historian of science
Olesko Castle, in Ukraine